Leonid "Leon" Sharf (born 5 July 1982) is a Ukrainian American professional association football player.

Playing career 
In 2009, Sharf was named to the national football side to represent the United States at the 2009 Maccabiah Games.

Statistics

Footnotes

1982 births
Living people
Ukrainian Jews
Ukrainian emigrants to the United States
Jewish American sportspeople
American soccer players
Association football midfielders
American expatriate sportspeople in Moldova
Expatriate footballers in Moldova
Bakersfield Brigade players
Maccabiah Games competitors for the United States
Maccabiah Games footballers
Competitors at the 2009 Maccabiah Games
LA Laguna FC players
CSF Bălți players
USL League Two players
21st-century American Jews